Fritz Henßler (12 April 1886 – 4 December 1953) was a German Social Democratic politician.

Henßler was born in Altensteig. He joined the Social Democratic Party (SPD) in 1905. He became managing editor of the Westfälische Allgemeine Volkszeitung, the Social Democratic party organ in the Westphalia region. From 1920 to 1933 Henßler was leader of the SPD branch Dortmund and from 1922 to 1933 chairman of the SPD in the district "Western Westphalia". In 1930 he was elected into the Reichstag.

After the NSDAP came to power, Henßler had to give up his public offices. He was arrested by the Gestapo in 1936 and was sentenced to one year in the prison Steinwache. However, instead of being released after one year, Henßler was sent to Sachsenhausen concentration camp in 1937, where he was interned until 1945. He survived the Death march to Mecklenburg in April and May 1945.

Henßler continued his political activities after the war. From 1946 to 1953 he was chairman of the SPD group in the state parliament of Northrhine-Westphalia and at the same time Mayor of Dortmund. He was elected into the Bundestag in 1949.

In 1953 Henßler rejected to again run for the Bundestag and he rejected the position as second federal chairman of the SPD. He collapsed at a conference in November 1953 and died in Witten on 4 December 1953.

References 
 Biography at Friedrich-Ebert-Stiftung
 Fritz Henßler at Landtag-NRW

Social Democratic Party of Germany politicians
1886 births
1953 deaths
Sachsenhausen concentration camp survivors
Members of the Reichstag of the Weimar Republic
Mayors of Dortmund